The coat of arms of Yukon is the heraldic symbol representing the Canadian territory of Yukon. The arms was commissioned by the federal Department of Indian Affairs and Northern Development and designed by well-known heraldry expert Alan Beddoe in the early 1950s. It was officially approved by Queen Elizabeth II in 1956.

The lower part of the shield represents Yukon's mountains, with the gold disks (called "bezants," a medieval gold coin) representing the territory's mineral resources and its birth in the Klondike Gold Rush. The two white wavy lines represents the territory's rivers.

In chief, the red cross represents England, the roundel (circular shield) surmounting it is in a pattern called "vair," a type of heraldic fur (literally squirrel fur), and representing the territory's wealth of fur-bearing animals.

The crest is an Alaskan Malamute dog standing on a mound of snow.

Blazon
Shield: Azure, on a pallet wavy Argent, a like pallet of the field, issuant from base two piles reversed Gules, fimbriated also Argent, each charged with two bezants in pale, on a chief Argent a cross Gules, surmounted of a roundel vair.

Crest: On a wreath Or and Gules, standing on a mound of snow Proper, an Alaskan Malamute statant Proper.

See also
Symbols of Yukon
Flag of Yukon

References

External links
Arms of Yukon in the online Public Register of Arms, Flags and Badges
Yukon Government – Emblems and Symbols

Territorial symbols of Yukon
Yukon
Yukon
Yukon
Yukon